Purukotó (Purucotó) is an extinct and poorly attested Cariban language. Kaufman (2007) placed it in his Pemong branch.

References

Cariban languages